Bessie is an HBO TV film about the American blues singer Bessie Smith, and focuses on her transformation as a struggling young singer into "The Empress of the Blues". The film is directed by Dee Rees, with a screenplay by Rees, Christopher Cleveland and Bettina Gilois. Queen Latifah stars as Smith, and supporting roles are played by Michael Kenneth Williams as Smith's first husband Jack Gee, and Mo'Nique as Ma Rainey. The film premiered on May 16, 2015. By the following year Bessie was the most watched HBO original film in the network's history. The film was well received critically and garnered four Primetime Emmy Awards, winning for Outstanding Television Movie.

Synopsis
Bessie Smith (Queen Latifah) is a young singer from Chattanooga, Tennessee. She and her siblings are orphaned when their parents, William and Laura, die, leaving their oldest sister, Viola (Khandi Alexander), to raise them. Viola is abusive and vicious and Bessie's childhood is unhappy. She along with her brother Clarence (Tory Kittles) scrape by working for local vaudeville shows. Her stage ambitions are frustrated by producers unwilling to feature dark-skinned Black women in their shows. Bessie sneaks onto traveling performer Ma Rainey's (Mo'Nique) train compartment and asks to join her show. Ma Rainey takes Bessie under her wing and helps her develop her abilities until Bessie's popularity causes a schism between the two women. Bessie leaves with Clarence to start her own show.

In addition to her lover Lucille (Tika Sumpter), Bessie begins a tumultuous relationship with Jack Gee (Michael K. Williams), a security guard who later becomes her husband and manager. After a humiliating rejection from the newly formed Black Swan Records, Jack manages to get Bessie a record deal with Columbia Records. Immense success follows, though Bessie encounters difficulties, including a stabbing attack after a show in her hometown, racism from white guests during an affluent party, and an attack during her show by the Ku Klux Klan, whom she courageously chases off. Eventually, Bessie reconciles with Viola, and moves her and all of her siblings into a mansion to live with her. The move causes additional tension with Jack, and Bessie pushes him further by adopting a young boy, whom she names Jack Jr., as their son. Eventually, Lucille leaves Bessie to have her own life. Despite her own affair with bootlegger Richard Morgan (Mike Epps), Bessie is infuriated upon discovering that Jack is bankrolling his mistress, up and coming performer Gertrude Saunders. After a violent quarrel, Jack leaves her. Bessie spirals into depression and alcohol. Jack returns, kidnapping Jack Jr. with the assistance of Viola, and takes him to live with him, contending that Bessie is an unfit mother.

During the Great Depression, Bessie's fortune evaporates, forcing her and Clarence to move into a small apartment. Bessie reconciles with Ma Rainey and takes some time to recuperate from her personal losses. Eventually, she accepts Richard's love for her and the two begin a relationship. After hearing Lucille Bogan's licentious hit song "Til the Cows Come Home", Bessie performs once again and meets a young John Hammond in 1932 who wishes to produce her comeback tour. Bessie's comeback is a success and she later reflects on her life while discussing the future with Richard.

Cast

Queen Latifah as Bessie Smith
Michael K. Williams as Jack Gee, Bessie's husband
Khandi Alexander as Viola Smith, Bessie's older sister
Mo'Nique as Ma Rainey
Mike Epps as Richard Morgan, a romantic interest of Bessie's and later, her lifetime companion
Tory Kittles as Clarence Smith, Bessie's older brother
Tika Sumpter as Lucille, a romantic interest of Bessie's, a fictional character who is likely a composite of several of Smith's real life female companions and lovers
Oliver Platt as Carl Van Vechten, artistic photographer
Bryan Greenberg as John Hammond, record producer and critic
Charles S. Dutton as William 'Pa' Rainey
Joe Knezevich as Frank Walker
Jeremie Harris as Langston Hughes
Chantelle Rose as Gertrude Saunders

Production
A first draft screenplay was written by playwright Horton Foote at a time when Columbia Pictures was slated to produce the film, but the project died when the studio became involved in a financial irregularity that threatened its existence. Mr. Foote purchased his screenplay back from Columbia and acquired the film rights from biographer Chris Albertson. In the early 1990s, when the possibility of producers Richard D. Zanuck and Lili Fini Zanuck taking over the project arose, Albertson suggested Queen Latifah for the lead, but the project lay dormant when financing could not be found. Upon Horton Foote's death in 2009, the script and film rights became the property of his daughter, actress Hallie Foote, who took it to the Zanucks and HBO. Thus, press releases claim that Bessie has been "22 years in the making." As part of the HBO deal, Queen Latifah is credited as one of the executive producers. The project was filmed in Atlanta, Georgia.

An early article announcing the HBO film indicated it would be based on Bessie, a 1972 biography by Chris Albertson, but a year later the book was not included in the film's credits or promotion, nor did the end result bear but a peripheral resemblance to Albertson's book. An HBO interview with director and screenwriter Dee Rees inquired which books were most influential to her research. Rees replied, "Blues Legacies and Black Feminism by Angela Davis; Blues Empress in Black Chattanooga: Bessie Smith and the Emerging Urban South by Michelle Scott; and Jamaica Kincaid's book, Autobiography of My Mother, really informed me visually and thematically. "

Reception 
The film received positive reviews from critics, with many critics praising the performances of Queen Latifah, Mo'Nique, and Michael K. Williams, while criticizing the use of the "Hollywood biopic" formula. Rotten Tomatoes gave it a score of 91% based on 32 reviews, with an average rating of 6.8/10. The website's critics consensus reads: "Strong performances, led by Queen Latifah, overpower a middling script in the entertaining and informative Bessie." Metacritic gave the film a score of 75 out of 100 based on 20 critic reviews.

As of 2016, Bessie remained the most watched HBO original movie of all time with 1.34 million viewers and an 18–49 demo rating of 0.4.

Accolades

References

External links

2015 television films
2015 films
2015 biographical drama films
2015 LGBT-related films
African-American films
African-American biographical dramas
African-American LGBT-related films
African-American musical films
American biographical films
American LGBT-related films
Biographical films about singers
Biographical television films
Bisexuality-related films
Cultural depictions of Bessie Smith
Films directed by Dee Rees
Films scored by Rachel Portman
Films set in the 1920s
Films set in the 1930s
Films shot in Atlanta
HBO Films films
Primetime Emmy Award for Outstanding Made for Television Movie winners
The Zanuck Company films
American drama television films
2010s American films